Antonio Stefano Benni (18 April 1880 – 27 December 1945) was an Italian entrepreneur and politician who served as President of the General Confederation of Italian Industry from 1923 until 1934.

Biography
His father, a financial intendant, died before his birth. he spent his childhood first in Cuneo and then, until 1883, in Milan. In 1894, forced by family needs to interrupt his studies,  Due to financial hardship, in 1894 he stopped his studies and went to work as an apprentice for Ercole Marelli.

Marelli produced small electrical and mechanical equipment, and from 1896 embarked on the path of production specialization with the manufacture of electric fans. This choice decreed the success of the company and its rapid dimensional growth: Marelli was responsible for the technical aspects of production, while the young Benni soon took charge of the organizational and commercial management. In order to guarantee a large market and create an efficient network of representatives, starting from 1900 he made numerous trips to Europe and Latin America.

In a few years, Marelli's sales could be considerably on the domestic and foreign markets and in 1905 Marelli and Benni decided to leave the city workshop to design and build, in seven months, a large factory in Sesto San Giovanni (Milan). The world conflict determined a further increase in the activities of Marelli which, in 1915, started the production of magnets. In 1919 Benni, together with Marelli and Giovanni Agnelli, established the Fabbrica Italiana Magneti Marelli, whose capital was paid in equal parts by Fiat and Marelli. 

In 1922 Ercole Marelli died and his son Fermo took over the property. Benni assumed the presidency of the company and held the position from 1922 to 1935, when Fermo Marelli took over. He later covered several prestigious positions in prestigious banks, companies and corporations. In the first post-war period he was made a Knight of labor. He was member of the Higher Council of Economy and Labor and in 1921 he was elected Deputy of the Kingdom of Italy. 

In 1923 he was called to the presidency of Confindustria, a role he left to Alberto Pirelli in 1934.

Also in 1923 he participated in Mussolini's political campaign carried out by the industrialists, who self-taxed themselves in the measure of 2 per thousand of the capital of their companies to favor the propaganda operations of the nascent regime; also for this operation he was one of deputies elected with the Fascist list in 1924. In 1929 he was included again in the fascist list which was elected by popular plebiscite. 

Starting from 24 January 1935, Benni held the position of Minister of Communications on behalf of the fascist government of Benito Mussolini. Benni remained in that role until 31 October 1939.

In the last years of his life he reduced his political activity. After 8 September he refused to join the Italian Social Republic and indeed, on the night of 20 August 1944, while he was in Stresa, he was arrested together with his wife by fascist agents under the orders of the prefect of Novara. Taken to the local town hall, he was brutally beaten, then locked up in the prisons of the castle of Novara. Benni claimed he never knew exactly why he arrested him; he believed, however, that they wanted to force him to give his adhesion to the Fascist Republic. He was released after about a month. 

On April 27, 1945, the National Liberation Committee of Upper Italy (C.L.N.A.I.), broadcasting from the microphones of Radio Milano Libertà, included his name among the arrest orders issued with its first executive decree. To escape both the persecution of fascist agents and the threats of anti-fascist partisans, Benni emigrated to Switzerland before the end of the conflict. 

He died in Lausanne on 27 December 1945.

External links
Antonio Stefano Benni, Treccani.it
Antonio Stefano Benni, SAN - Portale degli archivi d'impresa

1880 births
1945 deaths
People from Cuneo
National Fascist Party politicians
Government ministers of Italy
Mussolini Cabinet
Deputies of Legislature XXVI of the Kingdom of Italy
Deputies of Legislature XXVII of the Kingdom of Italy
Deputies of Legislature XXVIII of the Kingdom of Italy
Deputies of Legislature XXIX of the Kingdom of Italy
Members of the Chamber of Fasces and Corporations
Politicians of Piedmont